Kissa was a town of ancient Pontus on the Black Sea coast, on the road from Trapezus to Apsarus.

Its site is located near Hopa (Kise) in Asiatic Turkey.

References

Populated places in ancient Pontus
Former populated places in Turkey
History of Artvin Province